Joseph Morris Weber (11 August 1867 – 10 May 1942) was an American vaudeville performer who, along with Lew Fields, formed the comedy double-act of Weber and Fields.

Biography 
Born to a Jewish family, Fields and Weber formed their partnership while still children. The two appeared at Bowery saloons, museums, circuses, and in 1885 made their first stage appearance at Miner's Bowery Theatre, New York.  Their slapstick, rough-house, English-garbling antics soon caught on and they were a sensation in San Francisco where they appeared for 10 weeks for $250 per week, an unusually high salary at that time.  

The young men had a "Dutch act" in which both portrayed German immigrants. They returned to New York, appearing at Tony Pastor's theater on 14th Street, and in 1894 made their Broadway debut in Hammerstein's Olympia.  They had three companies on the road, and in 1895 the partners opened the Weber and Fields Broadway Music Hall where they produced very successful burlesques of popular Broadway shows. In the music hall's casts were some of the greatest performers and comics on the American stage at that time including Lillian Russell, Fay Templeton, Ross and Fenton and DeWolf Hopper, David Warfield, Peter F. Dailey, Mabel Fenton, Marie Dressler, Willie Collier and Sam Bernard.  They were forced to close the Broadway Music Hall when the fire at the Iroquois Theater, Chicago, caused strict enforcement of the fire laws in New York.  The partners were told that they would have to remodel or close the Music Hall and this caused a disagreement which temporarily split their partnership. The team broke up in 1904, but collaborated anew in 1912, producing the unsuccessful Hokey Pokey and opening Weber and Fields' Music Hall (1912–1913).

In 1923, Weber and Fields partnered yet again for a Lee DeForest Phonofilm sound-on-film short, where the team recreated their famous pool hall routine. This film premiered at the Rivoli Theater in New York City on April 15, 1923. Three years later, the duo were among those supporting Will Rogers and Mary Garden on the NBC Radio Network's November 15, 1926 debut broadcast. Their own NBC series followed in 1931.

Weber and Fields also reunited for the December 27, 1932 inaugural show at Radio City Music Hall, which proved to be the last stage appearance of the two performers as a team. They gave a cameo performance performing their "casino" routine in the 1940 movie Lillian Russell.

Legacy 
The backstage hostility in Neil Simon's play and film The Sunshine Boys is reportedly based on Gallagher and Shean, but also possibly on Weber and Fields, or on Smith and Dale, other similar comedy teams with partners in real-life conflict.

References

External links

 
Link showing one of the imitation Weber and Fields comic routines by Kolb and Dill

1867 births
1942 deaths
Jewish American comedians
American male comedians
Vaudeville performers